In cotidianis precibus is a motu proprio from Pope Pius XII dated 24 March 1945, regarding the new Latin translation of the Psalm to be used in the liturgy.

The Latin translation used hitherto had in earlier times been the one made from the Greek Septuagint by Jerome. According to the Pope, Jerome also realised that there must have been flaws in this translation of a translation, and that is why he translated the psalms directly from the Hebrew. However, this latter translations from the original Hebrew did not find its way into the tradition of the Catholic Church, while the Latin translation of the Septuagint became the common translation. This translation from the Septuagint was added to the breviary of Pope Pius V. Only in the course of the centuries, the Pope says, has the full richness of the original texts (in Hebrew) become apparent, especially through translations made - with the permission of the ecclesiastical authorities - directly from Hebrew into various vernacular languages.

Since the psalmists were inspired by the Holy Ghost, it is helpful to have translations that are as close as possible to the intentions of the original texts; all this - Pius writes - in accordance with his previously published encyclical Divino afflante Spiritu.

It is for this reason that the Pope decided to commission the production of a new translation of the Psalms, taking into account the tradition of the Vulgate, and using the new techniques and insights of textual criticism.

The work to produce the new translation was given by the Pope to the Pontifical Biblical Institute. In this motu proprio, the pope decides that this new translation must henceforth be used in the Hours:

References

External link 

 Text of the motu proprio in Dutch
 In the AAS (Acta Apostolicae Sedis. 37: 65–67. 1945.)

Psalms
Motu proprio of Pope Pius XII
Catholic liturgy
1945 documents